Air America may refer to:

 Air America (airline), a former civilian airline operated by the Central Intelligence Agency
 Air America (book), 1979 non-fiction book by Christopher Robbins
 Air America (film), a 1990 film adaptation of Robbins' book
 Air America (radio network), a former American radio network specializing in liberal talk programming
 Air America (TV series), a 1998-1999 TV series